Prashant Narayanan is an Indian actor, known for his roles in films like Waisa Bhi Hota Hai Part II, Shadows of Time, Bombil and Beatrice, Via Darjeeling and Murder 2. He also worked in the telefilm Ek Tamanna. His break came in the Bhatt banner film Murder 2.
He has acted in many Hindi films along with a few Malayalam films. He was last seen in the Netflix Mai. Kathmandu season 2(wajid)

Early and personal life
Born in Kerala, Narayanan grew up in Delhi. He was the state badminton champion and studied at the Kirori Mal College of Delhi University.

Career

In 1991, Narayanan moved to Mumbai with plans to start an ad agency. He started as assistant art director for films like Govind Nihalani's Rukmavati Ki Haveli, Subhash Ghai's Saudagar and Shyam Benegal's Sardari Begum. He also worked as a costume director for the TV series Chanakya. He started acting in plays again, and soon got several television shows like Saturday Suspense, Parivartan, Farz, Phulwa, Gatha, Kabhi Kabhie, Jaane Kahan Mera Jigar Gaya Ji and Shagun.

Narayanan got his first film role in 2002 in Hansal Mehta's Chhal as a hit man working in the Mumbai underworld. Though the film got mixed reviews from the critics, he was highly appraised for his portrayal of a hot-tempered, fun-loving goon. His next film was debutante director Shashanka Ghosh's Waisa Bhi Hota Hai Part II. Although Narayanan's role was similar to that in Chhal, the actor was once again appreciated by the critics widely.

In 2003, Narayanan was offered the lead role in the Academy Award winning German director Florian Gallenberger's film Shadows of Time. Narayanan played Ravi in the film. Shadows of Time was challenging for him, as the film set in Calcutta, was to be in Bengali language. Narayanan, being a Malayalee, had to take lessons in Bengali to convincingly portray the role.

In 2009, he played a notable role in the show Bandini, aired on NDTV Imagine. He played the antagonist in Peter Gaya Kaam Se, which also starred Rajeev Khandelwal and Lekha Washington. In 2010, Narayanan appeared in Pravesh Bhardwaj's Mr. Singh Mrs. Mehta, alongside Aruna Shields, where he portrayed the role of Ashwin Mehta, an artist and a painter who has an extra-marital affair with someone's wife, sometimes he even paints her nude picture.

In 2011, he appeared in the role of Dheeraj Pandey in the film Murder 2, which was a sequel to the 2004 film Murder. In the film, he played a psychopath serial killer, who pretends as a customer to call girls and kills them mercilessly. The film turned out to be the success and one of the highest grossing Bollywood films of 2011, where Narayanan's role was highly acclaimed by the critics and public alike.

In 2013, he acted in a Malayalam film Edavappathy (The Monsoon), directed by Lenin Rajendran. Rajendran had a special role in his new film Edavappathy that he had bookmarked for actor Jagathy Sreekumar, since he thought Jagathy was the only actor who could do justice to this very special role. Jagathy was hospitalized because of an accident and Lenin awaited Jagathy, for his return to the screen. Thus, Lenin came across Narayanan, who was reported to have done an awesome job in Edavappathy that stunned the entire unit.

Awards and nominations

Narayanan has received the following recognitions:

Filmography

Movies

Television

References

External links
 

Malayali people
Indian male film actors
Male actors in Hindi cinema
Kirori Mal College alumni
Living people
Indian male television actors
Male actors from Thiruvananthapuram
1969 births
Screen Awards winners
20th-century Indian male actors
21st-century Indian male actors
Male actors in Malayalam television
Male actors in Tamil cinema
Male actors in Kannada cinema
Male actors in Telugu cinema
Male actors in Bengali cinema